Martin Parr (born 1970) is a British actor and director, best known for his theatre work in the UK.

Life and career
Parr trained as an actor and his work includes the  West End productions of Woman In Mind, with Janie Dee, directed by Alan Ayckbourn at the Vaudeville Theatre, Maddie directed by Martin Connor, Time and the Conways with Penelope Keith and Pygmalion with Roy Marsden. His other theatre work includes most repertory theatres in the UK. Parr also made several guest appearances for the BBC including Tchaikovsky, Casualty and Doctors and toured the US several times including with Actors from the London Stage.

Direction includes a production of Milton's Comus for the London Handel Festival, significant work at the Rose Theatre, London, the Casa Da Música in Porto, Ambronnay Festival in France, Handel House in London, and has worked on contemporary and classic texts, musical theatre, opera and staged oratorios.

His work has also involved working with students at RADA and the Central School of Speech and Drama.

Parr was nominated for Best Director in the 2013 Off West End Awards for his production of Hamlet.

References

External links

1970 births
British male stage actors
Living people
Place of birth missing (living people)